Lufi Manua (born 26 March 1978) is an Australian professional rugby league footballer who played for the Sydney Roosters of the National Rugby League. He choice of position is Second-Row.

Manua made his first grade debut on ANZAC day against the Dragons in Round 7 2006 in a losing side. He started the game at Second-Row. He also played the fellow week in Townsville; once again starting in the Second-Row. The Roosters won the game 22-18.

References

External links
Roosters stun Cowboys in Townsville

Living people
1978 births
Sydney Roosters players
Australian rugby league players
Rugby league second-rows
Place of birth missing (living people)